Bishop Clint Steven Brown (born April 29, 1963)

Early life
Brown was born in Iota, Louisiana on April 29, 1963, as Clint Steven Brown. He learned how to play the trumpet while in his middle and high school band. His father tried unsuccessfully to get him to work as a mechanic, instead he opted for a career in music.

Music career
His music recording career commenced in 1998 with the album, Live from Orlando, released by Tribe Records. He has released over twenty albums, primarily with Tribe Records, yet releasing one album each with Habakkuk Music, Judah Music, and Daywind Music. The first album to chart, One Nation Under Praise, was released on September 11, 2002, and this placed at a peak of No. 4 on the Billboard magazine Christian Albums chart. His second album to chart, Faith Like Rain, was released on February 26, 2008 by Tribe Records, which this was his most charted release, and it placed on four Billboard magazine charts; on the Billboard 200 at No. 197, Christian Albums at No. 18, Gospel Albums at No. 7, and Independent Albums at No. 25. The third album to chart, Release, was released on April 3, 2012 by Habakkuk Music, and this placed at a peak of No. 30 on the Gospel Albums chart.

Personal life
Brown is married to Kendal, and they reside in Windermere, Florida, with their children.

Discography

References

External links
 Official website
 Cross Rhythms artist profile

1963 births
Living people
American male songwriters
American gospel musicians
Musicians from Florida
Musicians from Louisiana
Songwriters from Florida
Songwriters from Louisiana
People from Longwood, Florida
People from Iota, Louisiana